The following is a list of notable deaths in December 2016.

Entries for each day are listed alphabetically by surname. A typical entry lists information in the following sequence:
 Name, age, country of citizenship at birth, subsequent country of citizenship (if applicable), reason for notability, cause of death (if known), and reference.

December 2016

1
Sulabha Brahme, 84, Indian economist.
Don Calfa, 76, American actor (The Return of the Living Dead, Weekend at Bernie's, Me, Myself and I).
Elisabeth Carron, 94, American operatic soprano.
Jacques Cohen, 86, Egyptian-born Israeli actor (HaMis'ada HaGdola), complications from pneumonia.
Peter Corrigan, 75, Australian architect.
Patricia Crampton, 90, English translator.
Gérard Desrosiers, 97, Canadian physician.
Jo-Anna Downey, 50, Canadian comedian, amyotrophic lateral sclerosis.
Inkulab, 72, Indian poet and political activist.
Bor-ming Jahn, 76, Taiwanese geochemist.
Helen Ketola, 85, American baseball player (AAGPBL).
Barry Lloyd, 63, Welsh cricketer (Glamorgan).
Joe McKnight, 28, American football player (New York Jets), shot.
Ljubo Sirc, 96, Slovene economist.
Ousmane Sow, 81, Senegalese sculptor.
Zekarias Yohannes, 91, Eritrean Catholic hierarch, Bishop of Asmara (1984–2001).

2
Odeefuo Boa Amponsem III, 94, Ghanaian royal, King of Denkyira (since 1955).
Coral Atkins, 80, English actress (A Family at War, Emmerdale), cancer.
Lyle Bouck, 92, American military officer and war veteran (Battle of the Bulge), pneumonia.
H. Keith H. Brodie, 77, American psychiatrist and educator, President of Duke University (1985–1993).
Joan Chalmers, 88, Canadian philanthropist.
Billy Chapin, 72, American child actor (The Night of the Hunter).
Cherushii, 33, American electronic musician and radio host (KALX), injuries from fire.
Paul de Wispelaere, 88, Belgian writer.
Dejo Fayemi, 83, Nigerian footballer (national team).
Barry Frank, 86, American pop singer (Sammy Kaye Orchestra).
Mark Gray, 64, American country singer and songwriter (Take Me Down, The Closer You Get).
Halvar Jonson, 75, Canadian politician, Alberta MLA (1982–2004).
Sammy Lee, 96, American diver, Olympic champion (1948, 1952), pneumonia.
Ko. Si. Mani, 87, Indian politician.
Gisela May, 92, German actress and singer (Berliner Ensemble).
James Reiss, 75, American poet and novelist.
Teri Rofkar, 60, American Tlingit weaver. 
Rocco Salini, 85, Italian politician, President of Abruzzo (1990–1992).
Jean Stead, 90, British journalist (The Guardian).
Bosco Tjan, 50, American professor and psychologist, stabbed.
Tove Kari Viken, 74, Norwegian politician, MP (1989–1997).

3
Harry Balk, 91, American record producer and record company executive.  
Willie Casey, 84, Irish Gaelic football player (Mayo).
Dave Cropper, 70, British Olympic athlete.
Susan Cummings, 86, German-born American actress, cardiogenic shock.
Newman Darby, 88, American sailboard inventor.
Gigliola Frazzoni, 93, Italian opera singer.
Nikola Gigov, 79, Bulgarian author.
Herbert Hardesty, 91, American jazz musician.
Sir David Hay, 88, New Zealand cardiologist, anti-smoking campaigner.
Arthur Latham, 86, British politician, MP for Paddington North (1969–1974) and Paddington (1974–1979), Leader of London Borough of Havering (1990–1996).
Bengt Lindqvist, 80, Swedish politician, MP (1982–1995).
Bhai Mahavir, 94, Indian politician, Governor of Madhya Pradesh (1998-2003).
Nancy Mairs, 73, American writer.
Brockway McMillan, 101, American government official and scientist, Director of the National Reconnaissance Office (1963–1965).
Antonio Membrado, 81, Spanish classical guitarist.
Kuforiji Olubi, 80, Nigerian businesswoman and politician.
Rémy Pflimlin, 62, French businessman, CEO of France Télévisions, cancer.
Leonard B. Sand, 88, American judge.
Bekal Utsahi, 92, Indian poet and politician, MP (1986–1992), brain haemorrhage.

4
Hiroshi Arakawa, 86, Japanese baseball player (Mainichi Orions), batting coach (Yomiuri Giants) and manager (Yakult Swallows), cardiac arrest.
Byron Birdsall, 78, American watercolor painter, heart failure.
Lady Moyra Browne, 98, British nursing administrator.
Tadeusz Chmielewski, 89, Polish film director, screenwriter and producer.
Leonard T. Connors, 87, American politician, member of the New Jersey Senate (1982–2008).
Kamarou Fassassi, 68, Beninese politician, Minister of Mines, Energy and Hydraulics (2001–2006).
Julia Gomelskaya, 52, Ukrainian composer, traffic collision.
Gotlib, 82, French comics artist (Gai-Luron, Les Dingodossiers, La Rubrique-à-Brac).
Ferreira Gullar, 86, Brazilian writer, essayist and art critic, pneumonia.
Radim Hladík, 69, Czech musician (Blue Effect), pulmonary fibrosis.
Peter Latham, 91, British air vice marshal.
Stu Locklin, 88, American baseball player (Cleveland Indians).
Jean-Loup Passek, 80, French film critic.
Patricia Robins, 95, British novelist.
Jack Rudin, 92, American real estate developer.
John Swaab, 88, Dutch Olympic equestrian
Margaret Whitton, 67, American actress (Major League, The Secret of My Success, Steaming), cancer.
Tiina Wilén-Jäppinen, 53, Finnish politician, shot.

5
Charles H. Belzile, 83, Canadian army general. Commander of the Canadian Army (1992–1996).
Big Syke, 48, American rapper.
Mogens Camre, 80, Danish politician, MP (1968–1987) and MEP (1999–2009).
Geydar Dzhemal, 69, Russian Islamic revolutionist and activist.
Julia Elena Fortún, 87, Bolivian anthropologist.
Petros Fyssoun, 83, Greek actor.
Jayalalithaa, 68, Indian politician and actress, Chief Minister of Tamil Nadu (1991–1996, 2001, 2002–2006, 2011–2014, since 2015), heart attack.
Mona Maraachli, 58, Lebanese singer, heart attack.
Marcel Renaud, 90, French canoeist, Olympic silver medalist (1956).
Larry Roberts, 53, American football player (San Francisco 49ers).
Rashaan Salaam, 42, American football player (Chicago Bears), Heisman Trophy winner (1994), suicide by gunshot.
Rodney Smith, 68, American photographer.
Robert Sumner, 94, American Baptist pastor and author.
 Sfiso Ncwane, 37, South African singer, kidney failure.

6
Bruno Bayen, 66, French novelist, playwright and theatre director.
Adolf Burger, 99, Slovak-born Czech typographer, memoirist and Holocaust survivor.
Brittany CoxXx, 38, American trans woman and performer.
Dave Edwards, 76, American football player (Dallas Cowboys), heart illness.
Lalit Mohan Gandhi, 65, Indian politician, fell from train.
Jan Frøystein Halvorsen, 88, Norwegian Supreme Court Justice.
Dave MacLaren, 82, Scottish football player and manager (Plymouth).
Jacky Morael, 57, Belgian politician.
Charles B. Reed, 75, American educator, Chancellor of State University System of Florida (1985–1998) and California State University (1998–2012).
Chonosuke Takagi, 68, Japanese judoka, world champion (1973), heart attack.
Peter Vaughan, 93, British actor (Game of Thrones, Brazil, The Remains of the Day), epilepsy.
Jim Vickers, 93, Indian Olympic hurdler (1948).
Luke Wendon, 90, British Olympic fencer.

7
Warren Allmand, 84, Canadian politician, member of the House of Commons of Canada (1965–1997) and Cabinet minister (1972–1979).
Brian Bulless, 83, English footballer (Hull City).
Ian Cartwright, 52, English footballer (Wolverhampton), renal and spinal cancer.
Viktor Danilov, 89, Russian-born Belarusian Greek-Catholic priest and Soviet dissident.
Paul Elvstrøm, 88, Danish yachtsman, Olympic champion (1948, 1952, 1956, 1960).
Mohamed Tahar Fergani, 88, Algerian singer.
Hildegard Hamm-Brücher, 95, German politician.
Hui Yin-fat, 80, Hong Kong social worker and politician, MLC (1985–1995), MEC (1991–1992) and member of the PLC (1996–1998).
Junaid Jamshed, 52, Pakistani musician, television personality and preacher, plane crash.
Alex Johnstone, 55, Scottish politician, MSP for North East Scotland (since 1999), cancer.
Mike Kelly, 74, American politician, member of the Alaska House of Representatives (2005–2011), plane crash.
Phillip Knightley, 87, Australian journalist.
Greg Lake, 69, English singer and musician (King Crimson, Emerson, Lake & Palmer), cancer.
Martin Puhvel, 82, Estonian-born Canadian philologist.
Cho Ramaswamy, 82, Indian actor (Aarilirunthu Arubathu Varai) and lawyer, heart attack.
Mick Roche, 73, Irish hurler (Tipperary).
Helen Roseveare, 91, British Christian missionary.
Romilly Squire of Rubislaw, 63, Scottish heraldic artist.
Elliott Schwartz, 80, American composer.
İsmet Sezgin, 88, Turkish politician, Deputy Prime Minister and Minister of National Defence (1997–1999), multiple organ failure.
Allan Stewart, 74, Scottish politician, MP for East Renfrewshire (1979–1983), Eastwood (1983–1997).
Benny Woit, 88, Canadian ice hockey player (Detroit Red Wings).

8
Joop Braakhekke, 75, Dutch restaurateur and television presenter, pancreatic cancer.
Putsy Caballero, 89, American baseball player (Philadelphia Phillies).
Valdon Dowiyogo, 48, Nauruan politician, MP (since 2003).
John Glenn, 95, American astronaut (Mercury-Atlas 6) and politician, U.S. Senator from Ohio (1974–1999).
Gareth Griffiths, 85, Welsh rugby union player (Cardiff, national team).
Peter Jackson, 90, British animal conservationist and journalist.
Lélis Lara, 90, Brazilian Roman Catholic prelate, Bishop of Itabira–Fabriciano (1996–2003).
Joseph Mascolo, 87, American actor (Days of Our Lives, The Bold and the Beautiful, Jaws 2), complications from Alzheimer's disease.
Thomas C. Oden, 85, American theologian.
Dame Sheila Quinn, 96, British nurse, President of the Royal College of Nursing (1982–1986).
Fred Secombe, 97, Welsh priest and writer.
Sir Alan Urwick, 86, British diplomat and public servant, Ambassador to Egypt (1985–1987), High Commissioner to Canada (1987–1989), Serjeant-at-Arms of the House of Commons (1989–1995).
Peter van Straaten, 81, Dutch comics artist and political cartoonist (Vader & Zoon).
Palani Vaughan, 72, American Hawaiian music singer.

9
Romualdas Aleliūnas, 57, Lithuanian ceramics designer.
Élcio Álvares, 84, Brazilian politician, Senator (1991–1994, 1995–1999), Minister of Defence (1999–2000), and Governor of Espírito Santo (1975–1979).
Edwin Benson, 85, American teacher, last speaker of the Mandan language.
Georgia Blain, 51, Australian writer, brain cancer.
Lawrence Demmy, 85, British ice dancer, world champion 1952–1955.
A. Ross Eckler Jr., 89, American logologist, statistician, and author.
Alejandro González Jr., 23, Mexican bantamweight boxer, shot.
Sergei Lemeshko, 44, Russian footballer (Zarya Leninsk-Kuznetsky).
Mario Milano, 81, Italian-born Australian professional wrestler (NWA, WCW, AJPW).
Nola Ochs, 105, American centenarian, world's oldest college graduate.
Luke Owens, 83, American football player (St. Louis Cardinals).
Jens Risom, 100, Danish-born American furniture designer.
Franco Rosso, 75, Italian-born British film director (Babylon).
Robert Scholes, 87, American literary critic and theorist.
Rob Sherman, 63, American political activist, plane crash.
William N. Small, 89, American admiral.
P. Viswambharan, 91, Indian politician.
Ronald Webster, 90, Anguillan politician, Chief Minister (1976–1977, 1980–1984).
Günther Wilke, 91, German chemist.

10
George Junus Aditjondro, 70, Indonesian academic and political dissident.
Stefania Biegun, 81, Polish Olympic cross-country skier.
Peter Brabrook, 79, English footballer (Chelsea, West Ham United).
Felix Browder, 89, American mathematician.
John Cordner, 87, Australian cricket and football player.
T. Neil Davis, 84, American geophysicist and writer.
Bill Dineen, 84, Canadian ice hockey player (Detroit Red Wings) and coach.
Wolfgang Eisenmenger, 86, German physicist.
Damião Experiença, 81, Brazilian outsider musician.
Étienne Fabre, 20, French racing cyclist, fall.
Jean-Claude Frécon, 72, French politician, Senator from Loire (since 2001).
James Gair, 88, American linguist. 
A. A. Gill, 62, British writer and restaurant critic (The Sunday Times), lung cancer.
Gene Hamm, 93, American golf player and course designer.
Ken Hechler, 102, American politician, U. S. Representative from West Virginia's 4th congressional district (1959–1977), Secretary of State of West Virginia (1985–2001), stroke.
Hans-Eric Hellberg, 89, Swedish author (Kram) and journalist.
Eric Hilton, 83, American hotelier and philanthropist.
László Huzsvár, 85, Serbian Roman Catholic prelate, Bishop of Zrenjanin (1988–2007).	
Paul Shinichi Itonaga, 88, Japanese Roman Catholic prelate, Bishop of Kagoshima (1969–2005).	
Herm Johnson, 63, American race car driver, liver and renal failure.
Rick Klassen, 57, Canadian football player (BC Lions), cancer.
George Klein, 91, Hungarian-Swedish biologist.
V. C. Kulandaiswamy, 87, Indian academic.
Miles Lord, 97, American federal judge, U. S. District Court for the District of Minnesota (1966–1985), Attorney General of Minnesota (1955–1960).
Ian McCaskill, 78, British meteorologist and weatherman.
Tommy McCulloch, 82, Scottish footballer (Clyde).
Sergey Mikaelyan, 93, Russian film director (Love by Request).
John Montague, 87, Irish poet.
John Newhouse, 87, American journalist and author.
Luciano Nobili, 83, Italian footballer (Palermo, Reggiana, Pescara).
Allan Prell, 79, American radio host (WBAL).
William J. Richardson, 96, American philosopher.
Alberto Seixas Santos, 80, Portuguese film director (Brandos Costumes).
Balbir Singh Sidhu, 84, Kenyan Olympic hockey player.
Robert Stiller, 88, Polish author and translator.
William Usery Jr., 92, American politician, Secretary of Labor (1976–1977), heart failure.

11
Sadiq Jalal al-Azm, 82, Syrian philosopher and academician.
Sark Arslanian, 92, American football coach (Weber State Wildcats, Colorado State Rams).
João Castelo, 79, Brazilian politician, Governor of Maranhão (1979–1982), complications from surgery.
Harry Jones, 71, American football player (Philadelphia Eagles), heart attack.
Bob Krasnow, 82, American record label executive (Elektra Records), co-founder of the Rock and Roll Hall of Fame.
Charlie McNeil, 53, Scottish footballer (Stirling).
John Moffat, 97, British navy pilot.
Marie Muhammad, 77, Indonesian politician, Finance Minister (1993–1998), brain cancer.
Michael Nicholson, 79, British journalist and war correspondent.
Sid O'Linn, 89, South African cricketer and footballer (Charlton Athletic).
Kevin O'Morrison, 100, American playwright and actor (Charlie Wild, Private Detective, Sleepless in Seattle).
Ramesh Prabhoo, 78, Indian politician, Mayor of Mumbai (1987–1988).
Marion Pritchard, 96, Dutch-born American social worker and Righteous Among the Nations, cerebral arteriosclerosis.
Esma Redžepova, 73, Macedonian Romani singer.
Alan Sherlock, 78, Australian politician.
Thressa Stadtman, 96, American biochemist.
Roberto Vizcaíno, 59, Spanish tennis player and coach.

12
Barrelhouse Chuck, 58, American blues musician, prostate cancer.
E. R. Braithwaite, 104, Guyanese novelist (To Sir, With Love) and diplomat, heart failure.
Myron H. Bright, 97, American judge, U. S. Court of Appeals for the Eighth Circuit (1968–2016).
Lucila Campos, 78, Peruvian singer.
Gerard Clifford, 75, Irish Roman Catholic prelate, Auxiliary Bishop of Armagh (1991–2013).
Donald L. Corbin, 78, American judge, Arkansas Supreme Court (2005–2014), lung cancer.
Jean-Claude Deret, 95, French screenwriter (Thierry la Fronde).
Anne Deveson, 86, Australian writer and broadcaster, Alzheimer's disease.
Jimbo Elrod, 62, American football player (Kansas City Chiefs, Houston Oilers), traffic collision.
Jean Fisher, 74, British art critic and writer.
Mark Fisher, 57, British musician (Matt Bianco).
Robert Gomer, 92, Austrian-born American chemical physicist, complications from Parkinson's disease.
Shirley Hazzard, 85, Australian-born American writer (The Bay of Noon, The Great Fire).
Gustav Jahoda, 96, Austrian-born British psychologist.
Ratan Kumar, 75, Pakistani actor (Boot Polish, Jagriti, Do Bigha Zamin).
Lord Gyllene, 28, New Zealand-bred racehorse, winner of the 1997 Grand National.
Jim Lowe, 93, American singer-songwriter ("Green Door").
Jim Prior, Baron Prior, 89, British politician, Secretary of State for Northern Ireland (1981–1984) and Employment (1979–1981).
Konrad Reuland, 29, American football player (Baltimore Ravens), brain aneurysm.
Javier Echevarría Rodríguez, 84, Spanish Roman Catholic prelate, head of the Prelature of the Holy Cross and Opus Dei (since 1994).
Claus Ryskjær, 71, Danish humorist and actor.
Bob Schnelker, 88, American football player (New York Giants) and coach.
Leo Sharp, 92, American drug dealer.
Charles Mwando Simba, 80, Congolese politician.
Walter Swinburn, 55, British jockey, fall from window.
Bob Thomas, 62, Australian politician, member of the Western Australian Legislative Council (1989–2001), mesothelioma.
Esther Wilkins, 100, American dentist.

13
Ralph Brown, 90, American football player and coach.
Lawrence Colburn, 67, American Vietnam War veteran, intervened to end the My Lai Massacre, cancer.
Roy Harrover, 88, American architect, emphysema.
Bob James, 83, American Olympic sailor.
Hebe Charlotte Kohlbrugge, 102, Dutch theologian.
Ahuva Ozeri, 68, Israeli singer, laryngeal cancer.
Betsy Pecanins, 62, American-born Mexican singer, songwriter and record producer, stroke.
Ralph Raico, 80, American historian.
Thomas Schelling, 95, American economist and professor, Nobel Prize laureate (2005), complications from a hip fracture.
Poul Søgaard, 93, Danish politician, MP (1960–1990) and Defence Minister (1977–1982).
David Strangway, 82, Canadian geophysicist.
Zubaida Tharwat, 76, Egyptian actress (There Is a Man In Our House).
Alan Thicke, 69, Canadian actor (Growing Pains, Not Quite Human), talk show host (The Alan Thicke Show), and songwriter, ruptured aorta.
Fernando Vignoli, 56, Brazilian painter and sculptor, sepsis.
Andrzej Wasilewicz, 65, Polish stage and film actor (Nie ma mocnych), and director, Alzheimer's disease.
Yevgeny Yufit, 55, Russian filmmaker.

14
Chuck Allen, 77, American football player (San Diego Chargers).
Paulo Evaristo Arns, 95, Brazilian Roman Catholic prelate, Cardinal (since 1973) and Archbishop of São Paulo (1970–1998), complications from pneumonia.
Fosco Becattini, 91, Italian footballer (Genoa).
Shirley Dysart, 88, Canadian politician, MLA (1974–1995).
Stephen Fienberg, 74, Canadian statistician.
Bernard Fox, 89, Welsh actor (Titanic, Bewitched, The Mummy), heart failure.
Harold Gilliam, 98, American environmental journalist.
Garrett K. Gomez, 44, American jockey, drug overdose.
Hurricane Run, 14, Irish racehorse, euthanized.
Karel Husa, 95, Czech-born American composer.
Halfdan T. Mahler, 93, Danish physician, Director-General of the World Health Organization (1973–1988).
Michael Manning, 75, American Roman Catholic priest, complications of brain cancer.
Tom Ong, 78, Filipino Olympic sport shooter (1972, 1976).
Sadatoshi Ozato, 86, Japanese politician, member of the House of Representatives (1979–2005) and Minister of Labour (1990–91).
Päivi Paunu, 70, Finnish singer, cancer.
Jean-Paul Pier, 83, Luxembourgian mathematician 
Ahmed Rateb, 67, Egyptian actor (The Yacoubian Building), stroke.
Sir Dudley Smith, 90, British politician, MP for Brentford and Chiswick (1959–1966) and Warwick and Leamington (1968–1997).
Reginald Stackhouse, 91, Canadian politician and academic.
Harvey Stevens, 86, Australian footballer (Collingwood).
Jeremy Summers, 85, British film and television director (The Protectors, The Saint).
Gennady Tsygurov, 74, Russian ice hockey player (Traktor Chelyabinsk) and coach, cancer.
Bunny Walters, 63, New Zealand singer ("Brandy").

15
Albert Bennett, 72, English footballer (Rotherham United, Newcastle United, Norwich City).
Howard Bingham, 77, American photographer and biographer (Muhammad Ali).
Leanna Brown, 81, American politician.
Beki İkala Erikli, 48, Turkish self-help author, shot.
Shep Houghton, 102, American actor (The Wizard of Oz, Gone with the Wind, Perry Mason).
Shūji Iuchi, 66, Japanese anime director (Crush Gear Turbo, Mashin Hero Wataru).
Fran Jeffries, 79, American actress and dancer (The Pink Panther).
Osiride Pevarello, 96, Italian actor (Caligula, Ator 2 - L'invincibile Orion).
Craig Sager, 65, American sportscaster (NBA on TNT), leukemia.
Harley Saito, 48, Japanese professional wrestler, esophageal cancer.
Dave Shepherd, 87, English jazz clarinetist.
Bohdan Smoleń, 69, Polish comedian, singer and actor, lung infection.
Ajit Varman, 69, Indian composer.
Ron Ziel, 77, American railway historian.
Mohamed Zouari, 49, Tunisian flight engineer, shot.

16
David Berry, 73, American playwright (The Whales of August), heart attack.
Jigme Dorje Palbar Bista, 86, Nepalese royal, King of Mustang (1965–2008), complications from pneumonia.
Joyce Dalton, 83, Australian cricketer.
Walter Hachborn, 95, Canadian businessman, co-founder of Home Hardware.
Cecil Howard, 85, American pornographic film director.
Bill Malenfant, 87, Canadian politician, MLA for Memramcook (1974–1982), Mayor of Dieppe, New Brunswick (1971–1977, 1983–1998).
Faina Melnik, 71, Ukrainian-born Russian discus thrower, Olympic champion (1972).
Saintly, 24, Australian racehorse, national champion (1997).
Fred Swearingen, 95, American football official.
Jim Williams, 90, American politician, Lieutenant Governor of Florida (1975–1979).
Ive Mažuran, 89, Croatian historian.

17
Houshmand Almasi, 88, Iranian Olympic fencer (1964).
Eric Defoort, 73, Belgian politician, President of the European Free Alliance (since 2010).
Edmond Farhat, 83, Lebanese Maronite Catholic hierarch, Apostolic Nuncio (1989–2009).
Benjamin A. Gilman, 94, American politician, Member of the United States House of Representatives from New York's 20th, 22nd and 26th congressional districts (1973–2003), complications from hip surgery.
Bill Hanna, 86, American politician, Mayor of Shreveport, Louisiana (1978–1982).
Louis Harris, 95, American opinion polling entrepreneur, journalist, and author.
Henry Heimlich, 96, American physician, inventor of the Heimlich maneuver, complications from a heart attack.
Gordon Hunt, 87, American voice director (The Jetsons, Uncharted) and voice actor (Dilbert), Parkinson's disease.
Leanid Marakou, 58, Belarusian journalist, writer and historian, brain cancer.
Anne Ranasinghe, 91, German-born Sri Lankan poet.
Ismoil Talbakov, 61, Tajik politician.

18
Eddie Bailham, 75, Irish footballer (Shamrock Rovers, Wimbledon).
Ken Baird, 65, Canadian ice hockey player (Edmonton Oilers).
Rolf Trygve Busch, 96, Norwegian diplomat, Ambassador to West Germany (1977–1982), to the United Kingdom (1982–1989).
Enrique Cirules, 78, Cuban writer.
Frank Crotty, 78, New Zealand rower.
Brendan J. Dugan, 69, American academic administrator, President of St. Francis College (since 2008).
Zsa Zsa Gabor, 99, Hungarian-born American actress (Moulin Rouge, Touch of Evil, Lili) and socialite, heart attack.
Guinio Ganev, 88, Bulgarian politician.
Bobby Guanzon, 68, Filipino journalist and politician, cardiac arrest.
William H. Hudnut III, 84, American politician, Member of the United States House of Representatives from Indiana's 11th congressional district (1973–1975), Mayor of Indianapolis (1976–1992).
Sata Isobe, 72, Japanese volleyball player, Olympic champion (1964).
Vibeke Knudsen, 68, Norwegian diplomat, ambassador to Colombia (2009–2016).
Jack V. Lunzer, 92, Belgian-born British industrial diamond merchant and museum curator (Valmadonna Trust Library).
China Machado, 86, Chinese fashion model, cardiac arrest.
Léo Marjane, 104, French singer.
Sonny Moran, 90, American college basketball coach (West Virginia).
Herbert Nootbaar, 108, American businessman and philanthropist.
Rachel Owen, 48, British academic and print-maker, cancer.
Gustavo Quintero, 76, Colombian singer-songwriter.
Gordie Tapp, 94, Canadian country singer and entertainer (Hee Haw).
Margit Tóth, 55, Hungarian Olympic artistic gymnast (1976).
Heinz Ulzheimer, 90, German athlete, Olympic bronze medalist (1952).
Thomas Warburton, 98, Finnish writer and translator.

19
Elizabeth Bell, 88, American composer.
Ger Blok, 77, Dutch football manager (Honduras and Myanmar national teams).
Lionel Blue, 86, British rabbi, journalist and broadcaster, complications from Parkinson's disease.
Anne Borg, 80, Norwegian ballet dancer.
Phil Gagliano, 74, American baseball player (St. Louis Cardinals, Chicago Cubs, Boston Red Sox).
Hugh Iltis, 91, Czechoslovakian-born American botanist, complications of a vascular disease.
Andrei Karlov, 62, Russian diplomat, Ambassador to Turkey (since 2013), shot.
Annette Karmiloff-Smith, 78, British neuroscientist.
Dick Latessa, 87, American actor (Hairspray, Promises, Promises, Stigmata), heart failure.
Ville Lyytikäinen, 49, Finnish football coach (Atlantis FC).
Anupam Mishra, 68, Indian author, journalist and environmentalist.
Sir John Oakeley, 8th Baronet, 84, British Olympic yachtsman (1972).
Jim Pettapiece, 79, Canadian curler, world champion (1970, 1971), cancer.
Anique Poitras, 55, Canadian writer.
Kishori Sinha, 91, Indian politician. 
Fidel Uriarte, 71, Spanish footballer (Athletic Bilbao, national team).
Christopher Young, 71, British rugby league player (Hull Kingston Rovers, Great Britain), complications from cancer and chest infection.

20
Lawrence Borst, 89, American politician, member of the Indiana House of Representatives (1967) and Senate (1969–2005).
Robert Eddins, 28, American football player (Buffalo Bills), shot.
Raymond Heacock, 88, American engineer.
Toby Hemenway, 64, American author and educator, pancreatic cancer.
El Hortelano, 62, Spanish painter.
Patrick Jenkin, Baron Jenkin of Roding, 90, British politician, Secretary of State for Social Services (1979–1981), Industry (1981–1983), and Environment (1983–1985).
Andrew Karpati Kennedy, 85, Hungarian-born British author and literary critic.
Andrew Killgore, 97, American diplomat, Ambassador to Qatar (1977–1980).
Michèle Morgan, 96, French film actress (Port of Shadows, Passage to Marseille, La Symphonie pastorale).
Archie Norman, 104, British paediatrician.
Dame Frances Patterson, 62, British judge.
Paul Peter Porges, 89, American cartoonist (Mad).
Jagannatha Varma, 77, Indian actor (Devasuram, Dolls).

21
Mandell Berman, 99, American businessman and philanthropist.
Corno, 64, Canadian artist, throat cancer.
Deddie Davies, 78, British actress (The Railway Children, Stella) and musician (The Zimmers).
Welington de Melo, 70, Brazilian mathematician.
Sidney Drell, 90, American physicist.
Rob Gray, 54, Canadian production designer (Falling Skies, Fido, Shadowhunters), cancer.
Abdul Gafur Hali, 87, Bangladeshi singer, composer and lyricist.
John Gwilliam, 93, Welsh rugby union player (national team).
Robert Leo Hulseman, 84, American entrepreneur, inventor of the red solo cup.
Bob Jeffery, 81, British Anglican priest, Dean of Worcester (1987–1996).
Jaan Klõšeiko, 77, Estonian printmaker and photographer.
Remigijus Morkevičius, 34, Lithuanian mixed martial artist and kickboxer, shot.
Madame Nguyễn Cao Kỳ, 75, Vietnamese air hostess, First Lady of South Vietnam.
Sir Nigel Nicholls, 78, British civil servant, Clerk of the Privy Council (1992–1998).
Weston Noble, 94, American music educator and conductor, complications from a fall.
Şehmus Özer, 36, Turkish footballer (Amed, Mardinspor), traffic collision.
Vyacheslav Shalevich, 82, Russian actor (Seventeen Moments of Spring, The Master and Margarita).
Betty Loo Taylor, 87, American jazz pianist.

22
William Abitbol, 67, French politician.
Carlos Averhoff, 69, Cuban jazz saxophonist.
John Buckingham, 76, British jockey.
Mocho Cota, 62, Mexican professional wrestler (CMLL).
Yevgeny Dzhugashvili, 80, Russian-Georgian activist and politician.
Solomon Levy, 80, Gibraltarian politician, Mayor of Gibraltar (2008–2009).
Andre Martel, 70, American politician, member of the New Hampshire House of Representatives (1998–2002, since 2012).
Bill Price, 72, British record producer (Tom Jones, The Sex Pistols, The Clash). 
Sidney Percy Roberson, 79, British bodybuilder and director (The Sweeney).
Philip Saville, 86, British television director and screenwriter.
Kenneth Snelson, 89, American sculptor (Needle Tower, Six Number Two), prostate cancer.
Franca Sozzani, 66, Italian journalist, Editor-in-chief of Vogue Italia (since 1988).
Sir Dwight Venner, 70, Vincentian banker.
Lella Vignelli, 82, Italian designer, dementia.
Lillian Walker, 93, American politician.
Miruts Yifter, 72, Ethiopian long-distance runner, Olympic champion (1980), complications from collapsed lung.

23
John Aitchison, 90, Scottish statistician.
Anis Amri, 24, Tunisian terrorism suspect, shot.
Joyce Appleby, 87, American historian.
Claude Arnold, 92, Canadian football player (Edmonton Eskimos).
Doug Coombs, 92, New Zealand geologist (University of Otago) and cricketer (Otago).
Jean Gagnon, 75, Canadian Roman Catholic prelate, Bishop of Gaspé (2002–2016).
Robert Hinde, 93, British zoologist, Master of St John's College, Cambridge (1989–1994).
Meto Jovanovski, 88, Macedonian writer.
Willa Kim, 99, American costume designer (The Will Rogers Follies).
Jim Lehew, 79, American baseball player (Baltimore Orioles), congestive heart failure.
James F. Merow, 84, American judge.
Poul Pedersen, 84, Danish footballer, Olympic silver medalist (1960).
Tim Pitsiulak, 49, Canadian artist, complications from pneumonia.
Chetan Ramarao, 76, Indian actor.
Andrés Rivera, 88, Argentine writer.
Heinrich Schiff, 65, Austrian cellist.
Piers Sellers, 61, British astronaut and meteorologist, pancreatic cancer.
Luba Skořepová, 93, Czech actress.
Vladimir Stupishin, 84, Russian diplomat, first Ambassador of Russia to Armenia (1992–1994).
George Thompson, 88, Scottish politician, MP for Galloway (1974–1979).
Vesna Vulović, 66, Serbian flight attendant, world record holder for longest fall.

24
Edith Ackermann, 70, Swiss-born American psychologist.
Richard Adams, 96, British author (Watership Down, The Plague Dogs, Shardik), complications from a blood disorder.
Pape Badiane, 36, French basketball player (Chorale Roanne, Poitiers Basket 86, national team), traffic collision.
John Barfield, 52, American baseball player (Texas Rangers), shot.
Dinanath Bhargava, 89, Indian artist, cardiac ailment.
Aloke Bhattacharjee, 63, Indian cricketer and umpire.
Ron Broom, 91, New Zealand cricketer (Wellington).
Philip Cannon, 87, British composer.
Davis Earle, 79, Canadian physicist.
Joseph Fitzmyer, 96, American Roman Catholic priest and professor (The Catholic University of America).
Jeffrey Hayden, 90, American television director and producer (Peyton Place, The Donna Reed Show).
Felix Krivin, 88, Ukrainian-Israeli writer and poet.
Ted Meines, 95, Dutch military officer and veteran affairs activist.
Rick Parfitt, 68, British singer, songwriter and guitarist (Status Quo), infection.
Gil Parrondo, 95, Spanish art director and production designer (Patton, Nicholas and Alexandra, Travels with My Aunt), Oscar winner (1971, 1972).
Edwin Reinecke, 92, American politician, Member of the United States House of Representatives from California's 27th congressional district (1965–1969) and Lieutenant Governor of California (1969–1974).
Vasant Sarwate, 89, Indian cartoonist and author.
Liz Smith, 95, English actress (The Royle Family, I Didn't Know You Cared, Charlie and the Chocolate Factory).
Bronson Thayer, 77, American banker and civil leader, prostate cancer.
C. Howard Wilkins, Jr., 78, American businessman and diplomat, Ambassador to the Netherlands (1989–1992).
George Williams, 81, British racewalker.
Zhao Er-mi, 86, Chinese zoologist.
 Ben Xi, 22, Chinese singer.

25
Aghakhan Abdullayev, 66, Azerbaijani folk singer.
Sibylle Boden-Gerstner, 96, German costume designer and fashion writer.
Lady Marion Fraser, 84, Scottish music educator.
Sandra Giles, 84, American actress (Daddy-O).
John Gregson, 92, British George Cross recipient.
Karl Golser, 73, Italian Roman Catholic prelate, Bishop of Bolzano-Bressanone (2008–2011).
Jim Malacko, 86, Canadian ice hockey player (Lethbridge Maple Leafs).
George Michael, 53, British singer (Wham!) and songwriter ("Wake Me Up Before You Go-Go", "Careless Whisper", "Faith"), Grammy winner (1987, 1989), cardiomyopathy.
Alphonse Mouzon, 68, American jazz drummer (Weather Report, The Eleventh House) and record label owner, neuroendocrine carcinoma.
John Nike, 81, English businessman.
Miriam Pirazzini, 98, Italian opera singer.
Núria Pompeia, 85, Spanish cartoonist and feminist activist.
Vera Rubin, 88, American astronomer, innovator of dark matter theory, dementia.
Johnny Rutherford, 91, American baseball player (Brooklyn Dodgers).
Léon-Raymond Soulier, 92, French Roman Catholic prelate, Bishop of Pamiers (1971–1987) and Limoges (1988–2000).
Eliseo Subiela, 71, Argentine film director (Man Facing Southeast, The Adventures of God).
Rafael Vardi, 94, Israeli general.
 Notable Russian people killed in the Russian Defence Ministry Tupolev Tu-154 crash:
Elizaveta Glinka, 54, humanitarian worker and charity activist.
Anton Gubankov, 51, scholar and journalist, Director of the Department of Culture (since 2013).
Valery Khalilov, 64, military band conductor.

26
Abu Jandal al-Kuwaiti, 30s, Kuwaiti ISIL commander.
Kyriakos Amiridis, 59, Greek diplomat, Ambassador to Brazil, homicide.
Ashot Anastasian, 52, Armenian chess grandmaster.
John J. Benoit, 64, American politician, member of the California State Senate (2008–2009), pancreatic cancer.
Joachim Calmeyer, 85, Norwegian actor (Kitchen Stories).
Jaume Camprodon i Rovira, 90, Spanish Roman Catholic prelate, Bishop of Girona (1973–2001).
Duck Edwing, 82, American cartoonist (Mad).
Frances Gabe, 101, American artist and inventor.
Petr Hájek, 76, Czech mathematician.
Ricky Harris, 54, American comedian and actor (Heat, Dope, Everybody Hates Chris), heart attack.
George S. Irving, 94, American actor (Underdog, Me and My Girl, The Year Without a Santa Claus), heart failure.
József Katona, 75, Hungarian Olympic swimmer (1960, 1964).
Bujar Lako, 69, Albanian actor (Amsterdam Express).
Antonio Martínez, 90, Filipino Olympic basketball player (1952).
Seth J. McKee, 100, American military officer.
Peter Nowell, 88, American cancer researcher.
Luciano Panetti, 87, Italian football player and manager.
Elvio Porta, 71, Italian screenwriter and film director (What if Gargiulo Finds Out?).
Martin Reagan, 92, English football player and manager (women's national team).
Buddha Sayami, 72, Nepalese politician and poet.
Barbara Tarbuck, 74, American actress (General Hospital, Short Circuit, American Horror Story), Creutzfeldt–Jakob disease.
Mary Wondrausch, 93, British artist and potter.
Ashot Yeghiazaryan, 73, Armenian diplomat and politician, Interim Minister of Foreign Affairs (1991).

27
Chrissy Adams, 49, American attorney, Chief Solicitor for South Carolina Circuit Court Tenth Judicial Circuit (since 2005), cancer.
Gloria Begué Cantón, 85, Spanish professor, senator and magistrate.
Mariza Corrêa, 71, Brazilian anthropologist.
Anthony Cronin, 88, Irish poet and novelist.
Bruce DeHaven, 68, American football coach (Buffalo Bills, Carolina Panthers), prostate cancer.
Jules Dervaes, 69, American urban homesteading leader, pulmonary embolism.
Maurice Failevic, 83, French film director.
Carrie Fisher, 60, American actress (Star Wars, When Harry Met Sally...), novelist and screenwriter (Postcards from the Edge), cardiac arrest.
Claude Gensac, 89, French actress (Scènes de ménages).
Heno Magee, 77, Irish playwright.
Annanias Mathe, 40, Mozambican criminal.
George A. Russell, 95, American educator, President of University of Missouri System (1991–1996).
Hans Tietmeyer, 85, German economist, President of Deutsche Bundesbank (1993–1999).
Ellen Watters, 28, Canadian racing cyclist, injuries sustained in a traffic collision.
Ratnasiri Wickremanayake, 83, Sri Lankan politician, Prime Minister (2000–2001, 2005–2010).
Chuck Wright, 97, American politician, Mayor of Topeka, Kansas (1965–1969).

28
Gregorio Conrado Álvarez, 91, Uruguayan politician, President (1981–1985).
Pierre Barouh, 82, French actor (A Man and a Woman), writer and musician, heart attack.
Lars Bilet, 89, Norwegian Olympic wrestler.
Gilles Borrie, 91, Dutch politician and historian, Mayor of Sleen (1960–1968), Tiel (1968–1973), Rheden (1973–1979), and Eindhoven (1979–1987).
Michel Déon, 97, French novelist and literary columnist, pulmonary embolism.
Donya Fannizadeh, 49, Iranian puppeteer (Kolah Ghermezi), cancer.
Minnevali Galiyev, 86, Russian Olympic skier.
Lev Gor'kov, 87, Russian-born American physicist.
Balozi Harvey, 76, American community activist.
Annelise Hovmand, 92, Danish director and screenwriter (Be Dear to Me).
Knut Kiesewetter, 75, German jazz musician, singer-songwriter and producer.
Kyi Aye, 87, Burmese writer.
Pan Pan, 31, Chinese-born giant panda.
Sunder Lal Patwa, 92, Indian politician, Chief Minister of Madhya Pradesh (1980, 1990–1992), heart attack.
Bruce D. Porter, 64, American Mormon elder, member of the First Quorum of the Seventy (since 2003).
Paul Powell, 83, American Baptist minister and educator, complications from a stroke.
Debbie Reynolds, 84, American actress, dancer (Singin' in the Rain, The Unsinkable Molly Brown) and singer ("Tammy"), stroke.
Edgar Robles, 39, Paraguayan footballer (Libertad).
Marilyn Sachs, 89, American author.
Jean-Christophe Victor, 69, French political scientist, heart attack.
Bernard Zaslav, 90, American viola soloist.

29
Raymond Burki, 67, Swiss cartoonist, cancer.
Derick Burleson, 53, American academic and writer.
Chris Cannizzaro, 78, American baseball player (New York Mets, San Diego Padres), emphysema.
Laurie Carlos, 67, American performance artist, playwright and theater director, colon cancer.
Keion Carpenter, 39, American football player (Buffalo Bills, Atlanta Falcons), injuries sustained in a fall.
Matt Carragher, 40, English footballer (Wigan, Port Vale), cancer.
Arthur H. Cash, 94, American academic and biographer.
Kamal Mani Dixit, 87, Nepalese writer.
Uzama Douglas, 18, Nigerian footballer (Gombe United), shot.
LaVell Edwards, 86, American football coach (BYU Cougars), complications from a broken hip.
Pooran Farrokhzad, 83, Iranian writer, poet, playwright, and encyclopedist, cardiac arrest.
Néstor Gonçalves, 80, Uruguayan footballer (Peñarol).
Santi Ibáñez, 58, Spanish actor (El Cor de la Ciutat, Plats Bruts), lung cancer.
F. Ross Johnson, 85, Canadian businessman (RJR Nabisco), pneumonia.
John Kelly, 84, British boxer.
Aleksander Koj, 81, Polish biochemist.
Ferdinand Kübler, 97, Swiss racing cyclist, Tour de France winner (1950).
Judith Mason, 78, South African painter.
Jinpachi Nezu, 69, Japanese actor (Farewell to the Land), pneumonia.
Maurice M. Paul, 84, American judge.
Norman Rimmington, 93, English footballer (Hartlepool, Barnsley), kidney failure.
William Salice, 83, Italian businessman and inventor (Kinder Surprise), stroke.
Lucien Schaeffer, 88, French footballer (Valenciennes, RC Strasbourg).
Gustav Schmidt, 90, German Olympic canoeist.
Peter Tamm, 88, German publishing manager (Axel Springer Verlag).
Olga Ulianova, 53, Russian-Chilean historian, cancer.
Philip Wolfe, 89, American mathematician.
Wacław Zalewski, 99, Polish construction engineer.

30
Ad-Diba, 89, Egyptian football player (Al Ittihad Alexandria Club).
*Cara Rafaela, 23, American racehorse, euthanized. (death announced on this date)
Rich Conaty, 62, American disc jockey, lymphoma.
Thomas Ludger Dupré, 83, American Roman Catholic prelate, Bishop of Springfield in Massachusetts (1995–2004).
Selig S. Harrison, 89, American journalist, blood disorder.
Gabriel Jiménez Remus, 76, Mexican diplomat and politician, Ambassador to Cuba (2007–2013) and Spain (2001–2007), member of the Senate of the Republic (1994–2000) and Congress of Jalisco (1988–1991). 
George Kosana, 81, American actor (Night of the Living Dead).
Con Linton, 78, New Zealand Olympic sailor.
Jan Lutomski, 79, Polish Olympic swimmer (1960).
Justo Mullor García, 84, Spanish Roman Catholic prelate, Apostolic Nuncio (1979–2000), President of Pontifical Ecclesiastical Academy (2000–2007).
Judith Ortiz Cofer, 64, Puerto Rican-American writer, liver cancer.
Balasaheb Vikhe Patil, 84, Indian politician.
Gopal Rath, 71, Indian poet.
Glen L. Rudd, 98, American general authority of the Church of Jesus Christ of Latter-day Saints.
Huston Smith, 97, American religious scholar and author (The World's Religions).
Matt Snorton, 74, American football player (Denver Broncos).
*Sutter Brown, 13, American Welsh Corgi belonging to Governor of California Jerry Brown.
Allan Williams, 86, English businessman and promoter (The Beatles).
Rose Wolfe, 100, Canadian social worker and philanthropist, chancellor of the University of Toronto.
Tyrus Wong, 106, Chinese-born American artist and film production illustrator (Bambi, Around the World in 80 Days).

31
James S. Ackerman, 97, American architectural historian.
Imtiaz Ahmed, 88, Pakistani Test cricketer, chest infection.
José Ángel Sánchez Asiaín, 87, Spanish economist.
Raj Brar, 44, Indian singer and actor.
William Christopher, 84, American actor (M*A*S*H, Gomer Pyle, U.S.M.C., The Smurfs), small-cell carcinoma.
Henning Christophersen, 77, Danish politician, Foreign Minister (1978–1979), Finance Minister (1982–1984), Vice-President of the European Commission (1985–1995).
Sir Dennis Faulkner, 90, British officer in the Royal Navy.
Peter Fernando, 77, Indian Roman Catholic prelate, Bishop of Tuticorin (1999–2003) and Archbishop of Madurai (2003–2014).
Edward Gamble, 81, Canadian Olympic archer.
He Qun, 60, Chinese film director (Country Teachers), heart attack.
Keiichi Ishizaka, 71, Japanese businessman (Universal Music Japan).
Manjurul Islam Liton, 48, Bangladeshi politician, MP (since 2009), shot.
Henk Koning, 83, Dutch politician, MP (1967–1977, 1981–1982, 1986, 1989–1991).
David Meltzer, 79, American poet and musician, stroke.
Shirley Neil Pettis, 92, American politician, Member of the United States House of Representatives from California's 37th congressional district  (1975–1979).
Prince Dimitri Romanov, 90, Russian prince, banker, philanthropist, and author, claimant to the headship of the Imperial House of Russia.
Orvis Sigler, 94, American college basketball coach (Army, Centenary).
Eva Šuranová, 70, Hungarian-born Czechoslovak athlete, Olympic bronze medalist (1972).
Robert Taussat, 96, French historian and author.

References

2016-12
 12